Navy Captain (retired) Musbau Atanda Yusuf was appointed the Administrator of Ekiti State, Nigeria during the transitional regime of General Abdulsalami Abubakar, handing over to the elected civilian governor  at the start of the Nigerian Fourth Republic on 29 May 1999.

During his tenure he constructed the complex housing the Ekiti State House of Assembly, inaugurated on June 1, 1999, by his elected civilian successor Otunba Niyi Adebayo.
He assisted Sikiru Tae Lawal in creating peace in Ikere-Ekiti, which had been racked by communal strife.
Yusuf was required to retire in June 1999, as were all former military administrators.

References

Living people
Nigerian Muslims
Governors of Ekiti State
Year of birth missing (living people)